John Martin alias Honychurch (1525?–1592?) was an English politician.

Martin was an MP for Plympton Erle (UK Parliament constituency) in April 1554.

References

1520s births
1590s deaths
English MPs 1554